Gheorghe Păun (born December 6, 1950, in Cicănești, Argeș County) is a computer scientist from Romania, prominent for work on membrane computing and the P system.

Păun studied mathematics at the University of Bucharest, obtaining an MSc. in 1974 and a PhD in 1977 under the direction of Solomon Marcus. He has been a researcher at the Institute of Mathematics of the Romanian Academy since 1990. Păun was elected a member of the Academia Europaea in 2006, and a titular member of the Romanian Academy in 2012. He supervised the PhD thesis of 5 students. In 2016, he was awarded the title of Doctor Honoris Causa Scientiarum.

References

External links 
 Gheorghe Paun's webpage

Theoretical computer scientists
Romanian bioinformaticians
1950 births
Living people
Members of Academia Europaea
Titular members of the Romanian Academy
University of Bucharest alumni
People from Argeș County